The 2016 Eastern Illinois Panthers football team represented Eastern Illinois University as a member of the Ohio Valley Conference (OVC) during the 2016 NCAA Division I FCS football season. Led by third-year head coach Kim Dameron, the Panthers compiled an overall record of 6–5 overall with a mark of 4–4 in conference play, tying for fifth place in the OVC. Eastern Illinois played home games at O'Brien Field in Charleston, Illinois.

Schedule

Roster

Game summaries

Western Illinois

at Miami (OH)

at Illinois State

Austin Peay

at Southeast Missouri State

Tennessee State

at Tennessee Tech

Murray State

at Jacksonville State

Tennessee–Martin

at Eastern Kentucky

Ranking movements

References

Eastern Illinois
Eastern Illinois Panthers football seasons
Eastern Illinois Panthers football